Bank Brothers is a 2004 comedy film directed and written by Kenneth Guertin

Cast
 Kenneth Guertin as Diamond Man
 Crooked I as Mob Boss
 Alexa Havins as Store Owner
 Spider Loc as Innocent Perpetrator

Music
Spider Loc, as well as music composer Mikael Jacobson, collaborated on the opening credit music.

References

External links
 

Maverick Entertainment Group
2004 comedy films
2004 films
American comedy films
2000s English-language films
2000s American films